Swinton and Pendlebury is a town (and former borough) in the City of Salford Metropolitan Borough, Greater Manchester, England. It contains 23 listed buildings that are recorded in the National Heritage List for England. Of these, one is listed at Grade I, the highest of the three grades, one is at Grade II*, the middle grade, and the others are at Grade II, the lowest grade. The listed buildings include houses, churches and items in churchyards, a public house, aqueducts, a railway viaduct, cemetery buildings, a bandstand and war memorials.


Key

Buildings

References

Citations

Sources

1067507

Lists of listed buildings in Greater Manchester
Buildings and structures in the City of Salford
Swinton, Greater Manchester